CHNW-FM is a Canadian radio station broadcasting at 94.3 FM in Winnipeg, Manitoba. The station broadcasts a hot adult contemporary format, branded as 94.3 Now! Radio. The station's studios are located at 177 Lombard Avenue in Downtown Winnipeg (along with its sister station CFQX-FM), while its transmitter is located near Oak Bluff. Both stations are owned by Pattison Media.

History

Early years/Q94
CHIQ-FM first launched in 1963 as CJQM-FM, which simulcast CJQM-AM, an easy listening station owned by Winnipeg Broadcast Associates Ltd. (a division of Vancouver Broadcast Associates, the original owner of Vancouver stations CHQM and CHQM-FM). Despite the success of the format in Vancouver at CHQM, CJQM failed to attract an audience in Winnipeg and was sold in 1965, becoming CFRW-FM and then was bought by CHUM Radio. CHUM Radio then changed CFRW's call letters to CHIQ-FM in 1975.

After 1975, CHIQ was branded as Q94FM. It aired an adult contemporary format, and used the slogan "Winnipeg's Lite Rock Choice". In the mid-1990s, CHIQ was an affiliate of the syndicated dance music show "Pirate Radio" with Chris Sheppard. In 1997, CHIQ switched to a Hot AC format, still named "Q94FM", with the slogan of "Today's Best Music".

On August 29, 2006, at 8:45 a.m., CHIQ announced that after 25 years that it would no longer exist and that a new station would be created within a seven-day time span based on comments provided by listeners. Prior to the announcement, the regular morning staff had not shown up for work. This left many to speculate that they knew of the upcoming changes and did not want to announce their own demise. A later report debunked that theory for the interim. The station then went on for two weeks allowing listeners to call in and choose how they wanted the new 94.3 to be like.

On September 5, 2006, at 7:45 a.m., CHIQ re-launched its Hot AC format as the All New Q94, and kept its callsign, as well as its slogan and personalities.

In 2007, CHIQ-FM along with the other CHUM stations were sold to CTVglobemedia (Now Bell Media) and long-time morning show hosts Beau and Tom, who have been on CHIQ since 1989, moved to sister station CFWM-FM.

Curve 94.3
On August 29, 2008, at 8:45 a.m., CHIQ-FM relaunched again, this time with an alternative-leaning CHR (similar to Modern AC) format as "Curve 94.3", "Winnipeg's Pop Alternative", playing 943 songs in a row, commercial-free. When the 943 songs concluded, the station resumed broadcasting with an on-air staff, contests and "40 Minutes of Non-stop Good Stuff". In addition, CHIQ-FM was added to Mediabase's Canadian alternative rock panel.

On September 3, 2010, the station changed its slogan to "Real Music Variety" while only slightly changing its genre of music.

Fab 94.3
On November 17, 2010, a majority of the station's airstaff was released. On November 23, at 9:00 a.m., CHIQ began stunting with Christmas music using the slogan "Winnipeg's Christmas Music Station" until a new format was unveiled. To keep the new format secret CTV registered four .com and .ca domains for the new radio station; these included kool943.com/.ca, fab943.com/.ca, thebeat943.com/.ca and country943.com/.ca.

On December 26, 2010, at 3:00 p.m., CHIQ-FM became Fab 94.3, playing an oldies/classic hits format, formerly carried by sister station CFRW (now a comedy station). The first song on "Fab" was "She Loves You" by The Beatles. On January 4, the Bob FM morning show and CHIQ's past morning show ("The Show" on Curve 94.3) switched stations. This brought Beau and Tom, who previously worked at the station, back on air in the mornings.

On January 27, 2012, long-time personality Tom Milroy retired from radio after 20 years on CHIQ-FM (Q94FM and FAB 94.3), three years on sister station CFWM-FM and almost 40 years in the radio business.

On May 16, 2013, the Jim Pattison Group announced a deal to acquire both CFQX-FM and CHIQ-FM for an undisclosed amount as a part of Bell's acquisition of CFQX's parent company Astral Media. The deal will give the Jim Pattison Group its first stations in Manitoba, and would make CHIQ a sister station to CFQX. On December 20, 2013, the CRTC approved Jim Pattison's acquisition of CHIQ-FM and CFQX-FM, The acquisition was closed in early 2014. Following the purchase, the station was consolidated into CFQX's facilities in downtown Winnipeg. As well, the station dropped most of the 1960s songs from its playlist.

94.3 The Drive

On February 5, 2016, at 10:00 a.m. after playing "Life Is a Highway" by Tom Cochrane, CHIQ re-branded as 94.3 The Drive. The first song on "The Drive" was "Drive My Car" by The Beatles. While "The Drive” maintained a strict classic hits format in the early going, they evolved towards a classic rock format in July 2018. In addition, the station adopted the new slogan "Winnipeg's Classic Rock". The station focused primarily on rock music from the 70's, 80's and 90's. Winnipeg radio veteran Tom McGouran hosted the morning show with Vicki Shae, Kelly Parker hosted middays, Alix Michaels hosted afternoons, and Dez Daniels hosted on weekends.

94.3 Now! Radio
On October 13, 2021, the station's air staff were let go and CHIQ began running jockless in preparation for an expected format change to take place sometime the following Monday. The station's website was taken down, redirecting to the web stream of the station, with text promising that "the future of Winnipeg radio is coming". At 1 p.m. on October 18, after having stunted with the sound of a ticking clock for the previous day, CHIQ flipped back to Hot AC, now branded as 94.3 Now! Radio. The first song under the new format was "Hey Look Ma, I Made It" by Panic! At the Disco. The next day, the station changed call letters to CHNW-FM.

References

External links

 

HNW
HNW
Radio stations established in 1963
1963 establishments in Manitoba